Maria Verschoor (born 22 April 1994) is a Dutch field hockey player. She began playing for HC Hoekschewaard before joining HC Rotterdam. She moved up from junior to senior teams and in 2012 she moved to the Amsterdam Hockey & Bandy Club.

Verschoor joined the Netherlands national team when she was nineteen. She took part in the  2016 Summer Olympics, when the team took silver. She was also a member of the team which won gold in the 2020 Summer Olympics.

References

External links
 

1994 births
Living people
Dutch female field hockey players
Medalists at the 2016 Summer Olympics
Olympic silver medalists for the Netherlands
Olympic medalists in field hockey
Field hockey players at the 2016 Summer Olympics
Field hockey players at the 2020 Summer Olympics
Olympic field hockey players of the Netherlands
Sportspeople from Dordrecht
HC Rotterdam players
Olympic gold medalists for the Netherlands
Medalists at the 2020 Summer Olympics
20th-century Dutch women
21st-century Dutch women